is a railway station located in the town of Mamurogawa, Yamagata Prefecture, Japan, operated by the East Japan Railway Company (JR East).

Lines
Nozoki Station is served by the Ōu Main Line, and is located 185.8 rail kilometers from the terminus of the line at Fukushima Station.

Station layout
The station has a single side platform and an island platform, connected by a footbridge. The station is unattended.

Platforms

History
Nozoki Station opened on October 21, 1904 as a station on the Japanese Government Railways (JGR). The JGR became the Japan National Railways (JNR) after World War II. The station was absorbed into the JR East network upon the privatization of the JNR on April 1, 1987.

Surrounding area
 
Kabusan Prefectural Park

See also
List of railway stations in Japan

External links

 JR East Station information 

Stations of East Japan Railway Company
Railway stations in Yamagata Prefecture
Ōu Main Line
Railway stations in Japan opened in 1904
Mamurogawa, Yamagata